Phrynichus Arabius (lit. 'Phrynichus “the Arab”') or Phrynichus of Bithynia was a grammarian of the Greek language who flourished in 2nd century Bithynia, writing works on proper Attic usage. His name is also transliterated as Phrynichos or Phrynikhos. His ethnic background is disputed, mainly between an Arab and Bithynian Greek descent.

Life
The Suda states:
 

"Phrynichus of Bithynia, sophist. He wrote
Atticist, or On Attic Words in two books;
Collection of Usages
Sophistic Preparations ( (47 books, but some say 74)

As models of Attic style Phrynichus assigns the highest place to Plato, Demosthenes, and Aeschines the Socratic. The work was learned, but prolix and garrulous. A fragment contained in a Paris MS. was published by B. de Montfaucon, and by I. Bekker. Another work of Phrynichus, not mentioned by Photius, but perhaps identical with the Atticist mentioned by Suidas, the Selection of Attic Words and Phrases, is extant. It is dedicated to Cornelianus, a man of literary tastes, and one of the imperial secretaries, who had invited the author to undertake the work; it is a collection of current words and forms which deviated from the Old Attic standard, the true Attic equivalents being given side by side. The work is thus a prescriptive and reforming lexicon antibarbarum,  and is interesting as illustrating the changes through which the Greek language had passed between the 4th century B.C. and the 2nd century A.D.

Editions of the Eklogê, with valuable notes, have been published by C. A. Lobeck (1820) and W. G. Rutherford (1881); Lobeck devotes his attention chiefly to the later, Rutherford to the earlier usages noticed by Phrynichus. See also J. Brenous, De Phrynicho Atticista (1895).

Notes

References
I. Avotins "The sophist Aristocles and the grammarian Phrynichus", Parola del Passato 33 (1978), 181–91
J. de Borries Phrynichi Sophistae Praeparatio Sophistica (Leipzig 1911)
E. Fischer Die Ekloge des Phrynichos (SGLG 1, Berlin 1974)

External links
Phrynichi eclogae nominum et verborum atticorum, Chr. Augus. Lobeck (ed.), Lipsiae, in libraria weidmannia, 1820.
The new Phrynichus, being a revised text of The Ecloga of the grammarian Phrynichus, W. Gunion Rutherford (ed.), London, Macmillan and Co., 1881.

2nd-century writers
Ancient linguists
Ancient Greek grammarians
Atticists (grammarians)
Year of birth unknown
Year of death unknown
2nd-century Arabs
Arabs in the Roman Empire